Eyes of Fire may refer to:

Eyes of Fire (film), a 1983 American horror film
Eyes of Fire (band), an American musical group
"Eyes of Fire", a song by Rainbow on their 1982 album Straight Between the Eyes
"Eyes of Fire", a song by Pagan's Mind on their 2011 album Heavenly Ecstasy
Eyes of Fire, a 1995 novel by Heather Graham Pozzessere

See also
Fire-eye, a bird genus